Jam is a science-fiction post-apocalyptic novel by British video-game critic Ben "Yahtzee" Croshaw. It is his second published novel after Mogworld in 2010.

The concept for the novel can be seen in his weekly Zero Punctuation review of the survival horror game Dead Island where he says that people would not be able to cope if civilization ends in any other way than a zombie apocalypse.

Synopsis

The novel centers around a group of survivors in Brisbane, Australia after the city is covered with "carnivorous" strawberry jam that eats organic material.

Plot
One morning, Travis wakes up in his apartment in Brisbane to discover the city has been covered in a three-foot layer of man-eating strawberry jam after it devours his flatmate Frank. The jam eats organic material; such as rubber, cotton and people and is repelled by inorganic material such as plastic. The jam also can extend part of itself towards any organic material it can sense.

Travis and his roommate Tim soon join up with Angela, a journalism student, and Don Sunderland, a game designer (who had previously appeared in Mogworld.) While searching for supplies, Travis and Tim come across a giant goliath bird eater spider, which Travis decides to take with him, soon naming it "Mary."

The party decides to head to the Hibatsu Building, a large infrastructure in the middle of the city. While Tim believes they will need to rebuild society, Don believes they are merely waiting for rescue. Soon afterwards, a helicopter crashes into their apartment building, and the group recovers two American soldiers from the wreck; a female who names herself "X," and a male soldier who is named "Y." X lets it slip that they had mistaken Don's rescue sign for an organization named "HEPL," but denies it soon afterwards.

Unable to return to the apartment, the group makes their way to the Hibatsu Building. They discover a sailing boat named the Everlong, which they use for their travels. Along the way, Travis and Don stop by Don's office to pick up his "build," a hard drive. However they are ambushed by three men wearing bin-liners, who steal the hard drive and take it with them. Don and Travis realize they can move through the jam if they cover themselves with plastic.

The group tracks the plastic men to the Briar Center shopping center whereupon they discover a settlement of young people all wearing plastic coverings, who all engage in "ironic" behavior and worship "Crazy Bob." Their leader, Lord Awesomeo "ironically" executes somebody, leaving the group on edge. Tim becomes concerned with how the settlement is being run and discovers "Crazy Bob" to be the senile janitor.

Travis, concerned about Mary, feeds her a budgerigar he had found in a cage. He soon discovers the bird, named "Whiskers", had belonged to the "princess" of the settlement, Ravenhair, whose real name is Deirdre. It soon becomes apparent that anyone who tries to leave the shopping center is killed by the jam, and Tim takes the opportunity to assert himself as a replacement leader. Travis also overhears X stating she feels responsible for the jam, as well as disclosing something known as "the Sunderland issue." That night, Don and Travis flee the center; with Don recovering his build and accidentally disturbing Crazy Bob, with the two becoming trapped on the roof. They discover the cause of the deaths to be the work of Y, sniping anyone who leaves the center with arrows.

Don and Travis make it to the Hibatsu building and discover the settlement under a strict rule of bureaucracy. The head of divisions, named Kathy, instructs the two to return to the Briar Center as spies. Travis and Don return to the mall and manage to accidentally reveal themselves to a plastic person before learning that Tim is trying to usurp Lord Awesomeo as leader. After learning Y is the one killing the plastic people, Tim and the group take off in order to stop Y and gain political power.

X manages to subdue Y and stop his murder-spree, learning that he was sent by the Hibatsu Building to "suppress" the plastic people. Angela and Travis also discover Y's identity card which shows HEPL stands for "Human Extinction Protocol Libra." Upon returning to the plastic people however, Crazy Bob outs Don and Travis as the ones who had disturbed him as well as Travis’ role in Whiskers’ death, causing the plastic people to turn on them and oust them from the settlement. After learning that the Hibatsu Building was the one who sent Y to kill them off, Lord Awesomeo declares war and "ironically" sends his people to their deaths. Y manages to stop Lord Awesomeo and send them both into the jam.

Hibatsu acquires what little remains of the plastic population, and the group moves to the building, where Don reacquires his build. However, the jam starts to rise around the building, in response to the number of people who reside in it. It consumes Kathy and causes the bureaucrats in charge to consider killing off people to reverse it. X discovers an aircraft carrier named the USS Obi-Wan, which had been the one she and Y escaped from, abandoned out on the river. She and the rest of the group flee from the Hibatsu Building on the Everlong, but Deirdre is left behind.

The group makes it to the carrier, but the jam suddenly destroys the Everlong, separating Travis from the others. With X having hidden herself in a chest freezer prior to the event, Travis locks himself in with her to save them from the jam. X confides that she is responsible for the jam but the two are rescued before they suffocate.

After boarding the ship, Travis and the others are introduced to Dr. Thorn, a scientist who works for HEPL and was studying the jam and its effects. Don also makes use of the onboard internet connection to upload his build, while also finding out the jam had only covered Australia. Dr. Thorn reveals he could create a compound to neutralize the jam's effects if he had his flash drive, which had been given to Y. However, he is soon shot to death with a sniper rifle. Travis realizes that the shooter is Tim, who has locked himself in the bridge, intending to take the Obi-Wan out to sea.

Travis suddenly remembers that Don had taken Y's trousers after the helicopter crash, and realizes that this was "the Sunderland issue" mentioned earlier. Don discovers the flash drive in the pockets and uploads it. The gang discovers the truth behind the jam outbreak; it had been used for testing and was given to X and Y for transport. They had left it on the roof of their car and driven off, accidentally releasing it and causing it spread.

The Obi-Wan is attacked by the US Navy, who had set up a perimeter around the continent. X and Angela are consumed by the jam while trying to stop the ship and Travis manages to save Don's life. Travis chases after Tim, who had taken a life raft and manages to jump onto it as the carrier sinks. The two confide in one another; Tim had shot Dr. Thorn because he believed that jam was ultimately a good thing and did not want to give up his dream of rebuilding society. As the jam detects the two, Tim attempts to kill Travis to spare his own life, but Travis acts quickly and throws Mary onto Tim, startling him and sending him falling out of the raft and into the jam.

After some time stranded at sea (at which point he hallucinates that Mary is speaking to him) Travis is rescued by the US Navy, leaving him and Don the only two survivors left. Don uses the flash drive as leverage and he and Travis are sent to America. A few weeks later the jam is cleared away and Travis prepares to return to Brisbane to find Deirdre before leaving Mary in the care of Don.

Characters

Travis: The main protagonist of the novel, which is told through his perspective. Travis is an unemployed twenty-something who lives in the heart of Brisbane with his flatmates Tim and Frank. Travis does not have much of a personality, willing to go along with everyone else's plans rather than take any direction of his own, and many of his actions are entirely reactionary. He has a habit of "going off" whenever he witnesses someone's death. He is also oblivious at times, often revealing important information and stating the obvious. Early in the disaster, Travis discovers a goliath bird eater tarantula, whom he adopts and names "Mary." Though afraid at first, he soon grows emotionally attached to it, projecting his emotions through the spider, almost to the point he believes she is talking to him towards the end of the novel.
Tim: Travis’ flatmate, who previously worked as a freelance musician. Unlike everybody else, Tim is actually excited about the jam-apocalypse. He revels in the prospect of rebuilding society, and mainly focuses on finding a settlement and becoming self-sustained, growing into a natural leadership role. However, he goes insane after it is revealed the Jam did not cover the entire world.
Angela: A girl who lives in Travis and Tim's apartment building, and had previously worked at Starbucks. She is a journalism student, who spends most of the novel carrying a camcorder, intending on documenting everything. She frequently challenges X over her lying, and believes the jam was released as part of a conspiracy that she intends to unravel.
Don Sunderland: A game-designer who lives in Travis and Tim's apartment. Don is perpetually angry, cynical and sarcastic, and butts heads with nearly every member of the group. He frequently clashes with Tim over the group's motivations, as he believes they need to wait to be rescued. As a game-designer, Don attempts to recover his "build," a hard-drive containing his work, and spends the vast majority of the novel trying to recover it after it is stolen. Don had previously appeared as one of the human characters in Mogworld.
X: A female government agent who speaks in an American accent. She and Y crash land a helicopter into Don's apartment after mistaking a sign for HELP as "HEPL." It becomes apparently clear early on that X knows something about the jam, but she continually denies it and feigns ignorance, to the immense frustration of Angela, who cites she is terrible at lying. Later on Travis overhears that she is responsible for the jam, which turns out was caused by an accident. Her real name is revealed to be Yolanda.
Y: A male soldier who is X's bodyguard. Y rarely speaks or changes facial expression. He is extremely muscular, and is an expert in combat scenarios. Despite his cold demeanor, he is fiercely loyal to X, obeying her orders and protecting her from harm. He is tasked by the residents of the Hibatsu Building to suppress the population of those in the Briar Center, and eventually goes kill-crazy.
Lord Awesomo (real name Gerald): The cult-of-personality and the leader of the survivors in the Briar Center. He leads the "plastic people" through an "ironic" worship of "Crazy Bob" (although he frequently confuses irony for sarcasm), even going as far as to "ironically" execute people. He and Princess Ravenhair used to post on an internet forum. Tim challenges him for leadership of the mall via election, and almost succeeds.
Princess Ravenhair (real name Deirdre): The "princess" of the mall's residents. Even though she is the princess, Ravenhair is unsure about the "ironic" nature of her followers and is not comfortable being a leader. She bonds early on with Travis, and becomes friends with him. Ravenhair also owned a Budgerigar named "Whiskers," which Travis unwittingly fed to Mary, causing her friendship with him to fall apart. Her fate is left unknown by the end of the novel.
Crazy Bob: The subject of "ironic" worship by the residents of the mall, in reality Crazy Bob was the janitor whose keys were used to open the shops. He is a confused elderly man who shows signs of dementia; frequently asking for tea and threatening to call the police. He is completely unaware of the jam-apocalypse, the fact he is worshiped or that people have been executed in his name.
Kathy: The head of "acquisitions" department of the Hibatsu building.
Gary: The head of the board of directors in the Hibatsu building, who makes decisions.
Frank: Travis and Tim's flatmate and friend. He is the first to be devoured by the jam in the novel.

References

External links 
Jam at Dark Horse

2012 Australian novels
2012 science fiction novels
Post-apocalyptic novels
Australian young adult novels
Australian science fiction novels
Novels set in Brisbane
Brisbane
Dark Horse Books books